Southwest Corridor can refer to:

Southwest Corridor (Boston), a cancelled highway near Boston, Massachusetts
Southwest Corridor (Minnesota), a future light rail project in Minneapolis, Minnesota
The Southwest Corridor Plan, a transit project in Portland, Oregon
Southwest Corridor (St. Louis MetroLink), a proposed light rail line in St. Louis

See also
 Southwest (disambiguation)